Wasabi is a fast food restaurant chain based in the United Kingdom, focused on Japanese, East Asian-inspired fast food, especially sushi and bento, and operating primarily in London, England and New York, US, with further branches elsewhere in England as of 2022. Wasabi was founded in London in 2003 by Dong Hyun Kim, a South Korean entrepreneur. In November 2019, Henry Birts joined as CEO.

Funding 
In October 2016, the company secured £25 million in debt financing from HSBC to support expansion.

In May 2019, Capdesia, with co-investor Sushiro Global Holdings, purchased a minority stake of the company.

Further investment was made by Capdesia with co-investor, Sushiro Global Holdings, in 2020 to become the majority stakeholder. After becoming a minority stakeholder, founder Dong Hyun Kim stepped away from company operations in November 2021.

Finances 
In August 2020, Wasabi launched a CVA proposal under the supervision of KPMG. The main reason for this was to negotiate terms with creditors, especially lease agreement with landlords.

For the year ending in December 2020 during the covid pandemic in the UK, turnover dropped by 56.7%. Thereafter turnover improved considerably and the chain was considering expansion in the suburbs, but it was reported in January 2023 that the group was in breach of some of its loan covenants; directors said they had a "reasonable expectation" that a waiver obtained from the lender would be extended, but that this cast "significant doubt" on the group's ability to continue as a going concern.

Restaurants 
As of January 2015, Wasabi had 37 outlets in central London, and had opened their first branch in New York. In June 2015, a restaurant opened in Cambridge, England. By February 2018, Wasabi has a total of 61 branches around the world.

Since October 2017, Wasabi has also been opening sushi counters in some Marks & Spencer stores.

See also
 List of sushi restaurants

References

External links 
 
 

Restaurants established in 2003
Restaurant groups in the United Kingdom
Asian restaurants in London
2003 establishments in England
British brands
Fast-food chains of the United Kingdom
Sushi restaurants in the United Kingdom